Nine Elms is an area of south-west London, England, within the London Borough of Wandsworth. It lies on the River Thames, with Battersea to the west, South Lambeth to the south and Vauxhall to the east.

The area was formerly mainly industrial but is now becoming more residential and commercial in character. It is dominated by Battersea Power Station, various railway lines and New Covent Garden Market. The Battersea Dogs & Cats Home is also in the area.

Nine Elms has residential developments along the riverside, including Chelsea Bridge Wharf and Embassy Gardens, and also three large council estates: Carey Gardens, the Patmore Estate and the Savona.

History

Nine Elms Lane was named around the year 1645, from a row of elm trees bordering the road, though a path probably existed between York House and Vauxhall from the 1200s. In 1838, at the time of construction of the London and Southampton Railway, the area was described as "a low swampy district occasionally overflowed by the River Thames [whose] osier beds, pollards and windmille and the river give it a Dutch effect".

Nine Elms railway station opened on 21 May 1838 as the first London terminus of the London & South Western Railway, (LSWR) which that day changed its name from the London & Southampton Railway. The neo-classical building was designed by William Tite. The station was connected to points between Vauxhall and London Bridge by Thames steam boats. It closed in 1848 when the railway was extended via the Nine Elms to Waterloo Viaduct to a new terminus at Waterloo (then called Waterloo Bridge). The redundant station and the adjacent area, to the north of the new main line, became the LSWR's carriage and wagon works and main locomotive works until their relocation to Eastleigh in 1909. The company's largest locomotive depot was located on the south side of the main line. The buildings were damaged by bombs in World War II, and closed in 1967. They were demolished in 1968 and replaced by the flower section of the New Covent Garden Market.

Gasworks were established in 1853, close to the existing waterworks of the Southwark and Vauxhall Waterworks Company. Later Battersea Power Station was built on the site.

Vauxhall Motors was formed in 1857 by Scottish engineer Alexander Wilson at Nine Elms, originally as Alex Wilson and Company, before moving to Luton in 1907. There was a plaque commemorating the site of the original factory at the Sainsbury's Nine Elms petrol station on Wandsworth Road which has now been demolished and replaced with a new Sainsbury's superstore and high rise apartments as part of the current Nine Elms regeneration.

From the 2010s, the area has been redeveloped with new residential and commercial developments - including the new United States Embassy. In 2021, an extension of the Northern line at Battersea Power Station serves the area at a Tube station at Nine Elms.

Local politics
The bulk of Nine Elms is represented by three councillors who are elected to Wandsworth Council every four years. However, a small part of Nine Elms is in the jurisdiction of Lambeth Council. The next election for both wards is scheduled to take place in May 2022.

One Labour Member of Parliament represents Nine Elms, Marsha de Cordova.

Future

In October 2008 the United States Embassy in London announced that it would relocate to the area, moving from Grosvenor Square, Mayfair; the new embassy was completed in December 2017, and began operating in January 2018. The Embassy of the Netherlands in London also announced in April 2013 that it was relocating to the area from its current location in Hyde Park Gate, Kensington.

On 16 February 2012, Wandsworth Council approved Ballymore Group's plans for a 15-acre development. Embassy Gardens is set to provide "up to 1,982 new homes alongside shops, cafes, bars, restaurants, business space, a 100 bed hotel, a health centre, children's playgrounds and sports pitches". In 2014, it was reported that Ballymore had engaged Lazard and CBRE Group to raise about €2.5bn to fund the Embassy Gardens development.

Work commenced in 2013 on regeneration of the area around Battersea Power Station, including shops, cafes, restaurants, art and leisure facilities, office space and residential buildings. An essential part of the work is an extension of the London Underground to service the area. The extension will branch from the Northern line at Kennington and run west to Nine Elms and Battersea, adding two new stations. The power station structure itself was expected to be repaired and secure by 2016, with completion of the whole project by late 2020.

In 2015, Wandsworth council chose a design by Bystrup for a £40m pedestrian bridge between Nine Elms and Pimlico, although as of 2021 there are no firm plans to construct this.

See also
The Optimists of Nine Elms (1974 film starring Peter Sellers)

References

External links
 

 
Areas of London
Districts of the London Borough of Wandsworth
Districts of London on the River Thames
Privately owned public spaces